Chow Lai Yee (born 23 June 1967) is a Hong Kong breaststroke and freestyle swimmer. She competed in four events at the 1984 Summer Olympics.

References

External links
 

1967 births
Living people
Hong Kong female backstroke swimmers
Hong Kong female freestyle swimmers
Olympic swimmers of Hong Kong
Swimmers at the 1984 Summer Olympics
Commonwealth Games competitors for Hong Kong
Swimmers at the 1982 Commonwealth Games
Swimmers at the 1986 Commonwealth Games
Place of birth missing (living people)